Slovaks in Austria have a history dating back to the early centuries of the Common Era. Currently, there are 35,326 Slovaks in Austria as of 2016. Large communities of Slovaks can be found in Vienna and Lower Austria, with a smaller community in Styria.

History

Prior to the 20th century
Between the fifth and ninth centuries AD, Slovaks controlled the eastern part of what is now considered Lower Austria, where many ethnic Slovaks still remain.

From the 1880s the 1890s, around 230,000 Czechs and Slovaks emigrated to Austria proper, mainly for construction work and other menial labor jobs in the larger cities, particularly Vienna. At the turn of the century, an estimated 70,000 Slovak speakers in Austria, the vast majority being concentrated in Vienna and Marchfeld. Over the next 14 years, this number was decimated to 20,000.

Modern history
After the foundation of Czechoslovak Republic in 1918, many Slovaks emigrated back to the Slovakia region. In the 1923 census, only 5,000 Slovacophones declared their language.

In 1976, as part of the Treaties of St. German and Brno and the Austrian Ethnic Groups Act, Slovaks were recognized as an autochthonous ethnicity, and freedom to use the Slovak language officially was permitted.

In recent years, many thousands of Slovaks have emigrated from Slovakia, mainly due to the open borders of the European Union. The population of Slovaks had increased by 800% in 2016.

Notable Slovak Austrians
Carl Ludwig Doleschall, scientist
Jan Jesenius, physician and professor of anatomy
Konstantin Jireček, politician and Slavist
Boris Prokopič, footballer for SC Rheindorf Altach
Ludwig Schwarz, bishop of the Diocese of Linz
Tomáš Šimkovič, footballer for FC Tobol
Thomas Vanek, ice hockey player for the NHL's Florida Panthers

See also 
 Austria–Slovakia relations

References

Ethnic groups in Austria
Slovak diaspora